The Bec d'Ambès (literally Beak of Ambès) is the point of confluence of the rivers Garonne and Dordogne, in the Gironde estuary. Situated 15 miles north of Bordeaux, it has an oil refinery which was destroyed by bombing during World War II, but rebuilt after the war. It is in the Ambès commune.

References

Geography of Gironde
Petroleum industry in France